Ruth Springs is an unincorporated community in Henderson County, located in the U.S. state of Texas. As of 2000, its population was of 15.

Geography
The community lies on the western shore of the Cedar Creek Reservoir, few km far from the Texas State Highway 274, between the cities of Tool and Trinidad. The residential area is concentrated mainly around the lakefront.

References

Unincorporated communities in Henderson County, Texas
Unincorporated communities in Texas